Voltati Eugenio (internationally released as Eugenio and Turn Around Eugenio) is a 1980 Italian comedy drama film by Luigi Comencini.

It entered the 37th Venice International Film Festival. The film won the David di Donatello for best score.

Plot
Eugenio is brought up by his grandparents because his father and his mother split up soon after his birth. The story of his parents is told by flashbacks.

Cast 
Dalila Di Lazzaro: Fernanda
Saverio Marconi: Giancarlo
Francesco Bonelli	: Eugenio
Carole André: Milena
Bernard Blier: Grandpa Eugenio 
Dina Sassoli: Grandma Anna
Gisella Sofio: Grandma Edvige
José Luis de Villalonga: Tristano
Memè Perlini: Giancarlo's friend

References

External links

1980 films
Italian comedy-drama films
Films directed by Luigi Comencini
French comedy-drama films
Films scored by Fiorenzo Carpi
1980s French films
1980s Italian films